Dead Center is an album by tenor saxophonist Eric Alexander. It was recorded in 2004 and released by HighNote Records.

Recording and music
The album was recorded at the Van Gelder Studio on June 10, 2004. It was produced by Todd Barkan. The four musicians are tenor saxophonist Eric Alexander, pianist Harold Mabern, bassist John Webber, and drummer Joe Farnsworth. The arrangement of "Almost Like Being in Love" uses the harmony of "Giant Steps".

Release and reception

Dead Center was released by HighNote Records in 2004. The AllMusic reviewer compared it to "the moody and atmospheric mid-to-late-'60s work of fellow reedmen Wayne Shorter and Hank Mobley", and concluded that the album "finds Alexander revealing himself as a grounded and muscular improviser who never takes his eye off the target." On All About Jazz, Russ Musto said "Eric Alexander is one of the jazz tradition's strongest proponents, possessing an inviting sound and style that can be proudly called classic. On Dead Center he forges straight ahead with a satisfying program of standards and seldom heard original compositions by jazz masters".

Track listing
All compositions by Eric Alexander except where noted
 "One for Steve" – 6:49
 "Sonrisa" (Herbie Hancock) – 6:46
 "Almost Like Being in Love" (Frederick Loewe, Alan Jay Lerner) – 6:41	
 "It's Magic" (Jule Styne, Sammy Cahn) – 6:25	
 "A Few Miles from Memphis" (Harold Mabern) – 7:01
 "Search for Peace" (McCoy Tyner) – 8:03	
 "Dead Center" – 6:14
 "I Could Have Danced All Night" (Loewe, Lerner) – 3:58

Personnel
Eric Alexander – tenor saxophone
Harold Mabern – piano
John Webber – bass
Joe Farnsworth – drums

References

2004 albums
Eric Alexander (jazz saxophonist) albums
HighNote Records albums
Albums recorded at Van Gelder Studio